Monica Adventures (Turma da Mônica Jovem) is a Brazilian comic created in August 2008 by Mauricio de Sousa. The series features the characters from Monica's Gang as teenagers.

In January 2019, the series began to be published in the United States by the publisher Papercutz.

Plot 
The plot is centered on the four teenagers. Typical elements of the teenage life are: love, school, friends, nightclubs and problems to face. Although, the adventures do not finish for them all.

Characters

Main characters

Monica (pt: Mônica)
Jim Five (pt: Cebola)
Maggie (pt: Magali)
Smudge (pt: Cascão)

Volumes

The Four Magical Dimensions
 They Grew Up! (Eles cresceram)
 The Adventure Continues! (A Aventura Continua)
 New Challenges! (Novos Desafios)
 Strong Emotions... (Emoções Fortes)

The Adventures of the Day-to-Day
 The Adventures of the Day-to-Day (As aventuras do dia-a-dia)

The Brightness of a Pulsar
 The Brightness of a Pulsar - Part 1 (O Brilho de um Pulsar)
 The Brightness of a Pulsar - Part 2 (O Brilho de um Pulsar - Parte 2)
 The Brightness of a Pulsar - Final Part (O Brilho de um Pulsar - Parte Final)

Series I

 The Perfect Prince (O Príncipe Perfeito)
 Count on Me! (Conte comigo)
 An Eventful Day! (Um Dia de Agito)
 Challenge About Inline Skates (Desafio sobre Patins)
 Division By Two (Divisão por Dois)
 Be Careful What You Wish For (Cuidado com o que Deseja)
 The Weight of a Problem (O Peso de um Problema)
 Want to Date Me? (Quer Namorar Comigo?)
 Costume Ball (Baile à Fantasia)
 The Show Must Go On (O Show Deve Continuar)
 A Different World (Um Mundo Differente)
 Dungeons and Dragons (Masmorras e Dragões)
 Shiver Stories (Histórias de Arrepiar)
 The Game of the Kings (O Jogo dos Reis)
 Smudge - The Master of Volcano (Cascão - O Mestre do Vulcão)
 Tournament of Games (Torneio de Games)
 Bullying - Overextended (Bullying - Além do Limite)
 Love of Angel (Amor de Anjo)
 Welcome to Japan (Bem-Vindos ao Japão)
 The Invasion of the Zombies-Robots (A Invasão dos Robôs-Zumbis)
 The New Captain Ugly (O Novo Capitão Feio)
 The Wedding of the Century (O Casamento do Século)
 There's Cat in my Coffee (Tem Gato no meu Café)
 Full of Charm (Cheia de Onda)
 My Future (Meu Futuro)
 No Fear (Sem Medo)
 Virtual Poison (Veneno Virtual)
 Conflict of Generations (Conflito de Gerações)
 Appointment (Encontro Marcado)
 Opposites Attract (Os Oppostos se Atraem)
 The New Monica (A Nova Mônica)
 Champions of Justice (Campeões da Justiça)
 Halloween (Dia das Bruxas)
 I'm You (Eu Sou Você)
 Perfect Couple (Par Perfeito)
 Deadliest Games (Jogos Mortíferos)
 The Decision (A Decisão)
 Our Cub (Nosso Filhote)
 Single Boy Looking (Garoto Solteiro Procura)
 My Idol (Meu Ídolo)
 Android Hunter (Caçadores de Andróides)
 Umbra (Umbra)
 Umbra - Mystery Revealed? (Umbra - Mistério Revelado?)
 Umbra - The Last Battle (Umbra - A Última Batalha)
 Ninja Academy (Academia de Ninjas)
 Vacation at the Beach (Férias na Praia)
 Shadows of the Future (Sombras do Futuro)
 Macabre Circus (Circo Macabro)
 Macabre Circus - End of the Show (Circo Macabro - Fim do Show)
 A New Love? (Um Novo Amor?)
 Heirs of Earth (Herdeiros da Terra)
 Heirs of Earth - Conclusion (Herdeiros da Terra - Conclusão)
 The Strange Story of Sarah (A Estranha História de Sarah)
 The Strange Story of Sarah - Conclusion (A Estranha História de Sarah - Conclusão)
 Medical Emergency (Emergência Médica)
 We Are All Nerds (Somos Todos Nerds)
 Fresh Blood (Sangue Fresco)
 The Inverse Tower (A Torre Inversa)
 The Inverse Tower - Part 2 (A Torre Inversa - Parte 2)
 The Inverse Tower - Part 3 (A Torre Inversa - Parte 3)
 Never Again (Nunca Mais)
 Bucktoothed, Me? (Dentuça, Eu?)
 Reign of Youth (Reinado dos Jovens)
 Mismatches (Desencontros)
 Eternal Awakening (Eterno Despertar)
 The Nightmare Catcher (O Apanhador de Pesadelos)
 The Haunted Park (O Parque Assombrado)
 They're Back! (Eles Voltaram!)

Season II

 ...I Love You Forever! (...Te Amo para Sempre!)
 A World Away (Um Mundo de Distância)
 Greek Gift (Presente de Grego)
 Monica and the Knight (Mônica e o Cavaleiro)
 Between Heaven and Hell (Entre o Céu e o Inferno)
 Jim Five in Australia (Cebola na Austrália)
 Apathy (Apatia)
 Terrible Obsession (Terrível Obsessão)
 Jim Five's Disappearance (O Sumiço do Cebola)
 The Seven Plagues of Lemon Tree (As Sete Pragas do Limoeiro)
 Evolution of Machines (Evolução das Máquinas)
 The Disappearance of the Magicians (O Desaparecimento dos Mágicos)
 The Moon Dance (A Dança da Lua)
 The Portal of Darkness - Part 1 (O Portal das Trevas - Parte 1)
 The Portal of Darkness - Part 2 (O Portal das Trevas - Parte 2)
 Digital Influencer (Influenciadora Digital)
 Underwater Mystery (Mistério Submarino)
 Between Light and Darkness (Entre a Luz e a Escuridão)
 Japan Our Every Day (Japão Nosso De Cada Dia)
 Sabotage (Sabotagem)
 Electronic Danger (Perigo Eletrônico)
 In Control (No Controle)
 Fight Between Brothers (Briga Entre Irmãos)
 Captain Crusty (A Capitã Cascuda)
 Infinite Odyssey (Odisséia Infinita)
 The Youngest Heroes on Earth (Os Mais Jovens Heróis da Terra)
 The Perfect Melody (A Melodia Perfeita)
 The Society of Bones (A Sociedade dos Ossos)
 Mary Five's World (O Mundo de Maria Cebola)
 Beyond Jurerê (Além de Jurerê)
 The Master of the Villains (O Mestre dos Vilões)
 Digital Dirt (Sujeira Digital)
 The D.I.V.A Day (O Dia de D.I.V.A)
 Nick's Stink (O Cecê do DC)
 Opressed Love (Amor Reprimido)
 Invasion of Lemon Tree (Invasão do Limoeiro)
 Dangerous Weight (Peso Perigoso)
 Travel Diary (Diário de Viagem)
 Annie's Exchange Program (O Intercâmbio da Aninha)
 The Mystery of the Boomerang (O Mistério do Bumerangue)
 Stellar Soldier (Soldado Estelar)
 Brigade of Lemon Tree (Brigada do Limoeiro)
 The Other Side of the Coin (O Outro Lado da Moeda)
 Amnesia (Amnésia)
 The Mystery of the Lighthouse (O Mistério do Farol)
 The Secret of the Froufrous (O Segredo dos Frufrus)
 Wonderpark (Parque das Maravilhas)
 Dimensional Challenge (Desafio Dimensional)
 We Are All a Bit Crazy and Doctors (De Médico e Louco)

To Be or Not to Be?
  To Be or Not to Be? - Part 1 (Ser ou não Ser?)
  To Be or Not to Be? - Final Part (Ser ou não Ser? - Parte Final)

The Owner of World
 The Owner of the World - Part 1 (O Dono do Mundo - Parte 1)
 The Owner of the World - Final Part (O Dono do Mundo - Parte Final)

Monsters of ID
 Monsters of ID - Part 1 (Monstros do ID - Parte 1)
 Monsters of ID - Part 2 (Monstros do ID - Parte 2)
 Monsters of ID - Final Part (Monstros do ID - Parte Final)

Arises a Star
 Arises a Star - Part 1 of 2 (Nasce uma Estrela - Parte 1 de 2)
 Arises a Star - Part 2 of 2 (Nasce uma Estrela - Parte 2 de 2)

In Wonderland
 In Wonderland - Part 1 of 2 (No País das Maravilhas - Parte 1 de 2)
 In Wonderland - Part 2 of 2 (No País das Maravilhas - Parte 2 de 2)

The Laughter Note
 The Laughter Note - Part 1 of 2 (O Caderno do Riso - Parte 1 de 2)
 The Laughter Note - Part 2 of 2 (O Caderno do Riso - Parte 2 de 2)

Marina's Fifteen-Years Birthday
 Marina's Fifteen-Years Birthday - Part 1 of 3 (O Aniversário de 15 anos da Marina - Parte 1 de 3)
 Marina's Fifteen-Years Birthday - Part 2 of 3 (O Aniversário de 15 anos da Marina - Parte 2 de 3)
 Marina's Fifteen-Years Birthday - Part 3 of 3 (O Aniversário de 15 anos da Marina - Parte 2 de 3)

Nick Contra's World
 Nick Contra's World - Part 1 of 2 (O Mundo Do Contra - Parte 1 de 2)
 Nick Contra's World - Part 2 of 2 (O Mundo Do Contra - Parte 2 de 2)

Green Treasure
 Green Treasure - Part 1 (Tesouro Verde - Parte 1)
 Green Treasure - Part 2 (Tesouro Verde - Parte 2)

Shadows of the Past
 Shadows of the Past - Part 1 of 2 (Sombras do Passado - Parte 1 de 2)
 Shadows of the Past - Part 2 of 2 (Sombras do Passado - Parte 2 de 2)

The Crossbones Brigade
 The Crossbones Brigade - Part 1 of 2 (A Brigada dos Ossos Cruzados - Parte 1 de 2)
 The Crossbones Brigade - Part 2 of 2 (A Brigada dos Ossos Cruzados - Parte 2 de 2)

Special volumes
 Poster Magazine (Revista-Pôster)

Colored volumes
 The Secret of Camp (O Segredo do Acampamento)

Colored Jim Five Teen series
 Jim Five Teen - The Grand Prix (Cebola Jovem - O Grande Prêmio)

Colored Maggie Teen series
 Maggie Teen - Heart and Claw (Magali Jovem - Coração e Garra)

Colored Smudge Teen series
 Smudge Teen - The Sea Monster (Cascão Jovem - O Monstro do Mar)

Colored Monica Teen series
 Monica Teen - Remembrances (Mônica Jovem - Lembranças)

Books

Two books were released in Brazil, with the titles "Things that the Boys Should Know" and "Things that the Girls Should Know". They often talk of puberty, relationships and sexuality. More books will be published.

References 

Official Site
English Mural
Mauricio answers to a fan that asked her when Monica's Gang Teen in Colors #2 will come.

2008 comics debuts
Monica's Gang Teen
Monica's Gang
Comics adapted into animated series